Bayard is a city in Grant County, New Mexico, United States. It is near Santa Rita, east of Silver City. The population was 2,328 at the 2010 census, down from 2,534 in 2000. This city was incorporated on August 20, 1938.

Geography
It is located in east-central Grant County at  (32.759569, -108.134035). The city is in the valley of Whitewater Creek, a seasonal south-flowing tributary of the Mimbres River.

New Mexico State Road 356 leads northeast from Bayard  up the Whitewater Creek valley to Hanover.

Gila National Forest lies north from here. A semi-arid desert of predominantly grasses and yucca is in Bayard's southern portion.

Demographics

As of the census of 2000, there were 2,534 people, 970 households, and 719 families residing in the town. The population density was 2,916.4 people per square mile (1,124.6/km2). There were 1,100 housing units at an average density of 1,266.0 per square mile (488.2/km2). The racial makeup of the town was 65.67% White, 0.32% African American, 1.66% Native American, 0.04% Asian, 29.04% from other races, and 3.28% from two or more races. Hispanic or Latino of any race were 84.33% of the population.

There were 970 households, out of which 34.3% had children under the age of 18 living with them, 51.1% were married couples living together, 18.5% had a female householder with no husband present, and 25.8% were non-families. 23.6% of all households were made up of individuals, and 13.4% had someone living alone who was 65 years of age or older. The average household size was 2.61 and the average family size was 3.07.

In the town the population was spread out, with 29.2% under the age of 18, 8.5% from 18 to 24, 22.1% from 25 to 44, 23.3% from 45 to 64, and 16.9% who were 65 years of age or older. The median age was 37 years. For every 100 females, there were 87.4 males. For every 100 females age 18 and over, there were 83.0 males.

The median income for a household in the town was $21,957, and the median income for a family was $27,632. Males had a median income of $30,200 versus $17,132 for females. The per capita income for the town was $11,066. About 19.7% of families and 24.1% of the population were below the poverty line, including 33.8% of those under age 18 and 14.3% of those age 65 or over.

See also

 List of municipalities in New Mexico
 Fort Bayard Historic District
 Fort Bayard National Cemetery

References

External links

Cities in New Mexico
Cities in Grant County, New Mexico